The Calgary Stampeders was a  Canadian senior men's ice hockey team that played 25 games of the 1978–79 season in the Western International Hockey League. In 25 games played the team scored 117 goals and allowed 122 goals against to compiled a record of 12 wins, 11 losses and two ties for a total of 26 points. This team suspended its operations, midway through the season, on January 7, 1979.

References

Defunct ice hockey teams in Canada
Ice hockey teams in Alberta
Western International Hockey League teams
Calgary Stampeders (ice hockey)
1978 establishments in Alberta
1979 disestablishments in Canada
1978–79 in Canadian ice hockey